Binnayaga Buddhist Caves also known as Vinayaka or Vinayaga are located at village Binnayaga in the state of Rajasthan, India. The excavation has around 20 laterite caves facing south from east to west. This is monastic complex, the cells are smaller than Kolvi Caves cell. The stupa shaped sanctuary is the highlight of these caves. It has chaitya which bears windows. Another significant cave has two wings of an open courtyard. "It has at the back a closed lobby with vaulted ceiling and a central door flanked by a cell on either side. The moulded pedestal against the back wall is now empty."

These caves are located 8 miles away from Kolvi.

References

External links 
 PROTECTED MONUMENTS BY ARCHAEOLOGICAL SURVEY OF INDIA IN RAJASTHAN
 Caves of Niranjani

Buddhist monasteries in India
Colossal Buddha statues
Buddhist caves in India
Indian rock-cut architecture
Former populated places in India
Buddhist pilgrimage sites in India
Architecture in India
Caves containing pictograms in India
Tourist attractions in Jhalawar district
Caves of Rajasthan
Buddhism in Rajasthan